Prescott Park is a ten-plus acre waterfront park in Portsmouth, New Hampshire, United States. The land was purchased in the 1930s by two sisters, Josie and Sarah Prescott. The sisters, public school teachers, had used an inheritance to systematically purchase and clear properties along the Piscataqua River. The sisters' goal was to create a public waterfront park, free and accessible to all, replacing what had become a run-down and seedy industrial area. In 1949 the Prescott sisters' trust was established with $500,000. The park  was willed to the city of Portsmouth in 1954 for public enjoyment.

Since 1974 it has hosted full outdoor productions of Broadway plays for family audiences during the summer months. There are also many flower gardens and water fountains maintained since the mid-1960s.

The park is directly across Marcy Street from the Strawbery Banke Museum.

The Players' Ring Theater is located in the park.

External links
 Prescott Park at City of Portsmouth website
 Prescott Park Arts Festival

References

Geography of Rockingham County, New Hampshire
Tourist attractions in Portsmouth, New Hampshire
Parks in Rockingham County, New Hampshire